Chaosmosis is the eleventh studio album by Scottish band Primal Scream. It was released on 18 March 2016 on the band's First International label, through Ignition Records. The album's lead single, "Where the Light Gets In", was released on 1 February 2016 and features American singer Sky Ferreira. "I Can Change" was released on 14 March 2016 as the second single from the album. "Trippin' on Your Love" was released to US submodern rock radio on 16 March 2016 as the album's third single. The fourth single, "100% or Nothing", was released as a 12-inch single on 19 August 2016.

The album is the last to feature band member Martin Duffy prior to his death in December 2022.

Critical reception

Chaosmosis received generally positive reviews from music critics. At Metacritic, which assigns a normalised rating out of 100 to reviews from mainstream publications, the album received an average score of 65, based on 25 reviews. Writing for Exclaim!, Cam Lindsay called the record "an uneven effort by a band that specializes in doing whatever the hell feels right."

Track listing

Notes
  signifies an additional producer

Personnel
Credits adapted from the liner notes of Chaosmosis.

Primal Scream
 Bobby Gillespie – vocals ; synthesiser 
 Andrew Innes – guitar ; loops ; plug-ins ; synthesiser ; dulcimer 
 Martin Duffy – piano ; organ ; vibraphone 
 Darrin Mooney – percussion ; drums

Additional musicians

 Danielle Haim – backing vocals 
 Este Haim – backing vocals 
 Alana Haim – backing vocals 
 Jason Falkner – bass 
 Björn Yttling – synthesiser ; celeste ; piano 
 Christoffer Zachrisson – zither 
 Jim Hunt – flute ; saxophone 
 Rachel Zeffira – vocals, viola, violin ; backing vocals ; cor anglais 
 Deborah Chandler – cello 
 John Eriksson – drums 
 Sky Ferreira – vocals 
 Sophie Nevrkla – backing vocals 
 Grace Cockell – backing vocals

Technical

 Björn Yttling – production ; additional production 
 Andrew Innes – production ; engineering 
 Bobby Gillespie – production
 Lasse Mårtén – mixing
 Brendan Lynch – engineering 
 Ross Matthews – engineering 
 Gustav Lindelow – engineering 
 Hans Stenlund – engineering 
 Max Heyes – engineering 
 Sean Kellet – engineering 
 Joe Harrison – engineering assistance

Artwork
 Jim Lambie – artwork
 Mick Hutson – original photography
 Matthew Cooper – design
 Bobby Gillespie – design

Charts

References

2016 albums
Albums produced by Björn Yttling
Primal Scream albums